The Musikpreis der Landeshauptstadt München (Music Prize of the City of Munich) is an award, awarded since 1992, initially every two years but since 2000, every three years, alternating with the Theaterpreis and the Tanzpreis. The music prize rewards the outstanding work of artists or ensembles which have contributed to Munich to the reputation of Munich as a music city. The award is worth €10,000.

Winners 

 1992: Klaus Doldinger
 1994: Hans Stadlmair
 1996: Josef Anton Riedl
 1998: Manfred Eicher
 2000: Münchener Kammerorchester
 2003: Wilhelm Killmayer
 2006: Brigitte Fassbaender
 2009: Nikolaus Brass
 2012: Jazzclub Unterfahrt
 2015: Duško Gojković
 2018: Eva Mair-Holmes
 2021: Jörg Widmann

References

External links
 

German music awards
Music in Munich